Colin Michael Frechter (born August 1938) is a musical director, arranger, keyboard player, and vocalist.

Biography
Frechter attended Aldenham School in Elstree.

Career

Frechter worked in Harrods before joining the music business in 1958 as a clarinet player for the RAF. After his release from the Air Force in 1961, he worked for T.B. Harms & Francis, Day & Hunter, Inc. as a Musical Director for Page One Records.

Since 1967, he has worked with many artists, including the Four Tops, the Bay City Rollers (receiving a  gold disc for the  single "Bye, Bye, Baby (Baby, Goodbye)" and  the L.P., Once Upon a Star), Elaine Paige, Showaddywaddy, Elton John, Take That (including Robbie Williams), Shakin' Stevens, and Brotherhood of Man (including "Save Your Kisses for Me").

He currently directs theatre productions.

References

External links

Colin Frechter at Coda-UK

Living people
Music directors
English keyboardists
British music arrangers
1938 births
Eurovision Song Contest conductors
Place of birth missing (living people)